Chabi (c. 1216
–1281) was a Khongirad empress consort of the Yuan dynasty of Mongol, married to Kublai Khan (Emperor Shizu).

Life 
She was born around 1216 January  to Chigu Noyan and Tümelün behi (4th daughter of Genghis and Börte). She married Kublai as his second wife and bore him four sons and six daughters later. She was an important political and diplomatic influence, especially in pleasing the Chinese masses through reconciliation with Confucianism. She was compared to Börte through for her reputation. She was described as extremely beautiful and charming by Rashid al-Din.

Möngke Khagan died in 1259 while Kublai was campaigning against the Song Dynasty. She warned her husband of advancements of Ariq Böke beforehand. After conquest of China, she suggested a better treatment of the north Chinese imperial family, namely Empress Quan in 1276. She also introduced new court fashion in form of hats. Chabi also promoted Buddhism in the high levels of government fiercely. She also named her child under influence of Buddhism. She mediated religious disputes between Kublai and Phagpa, and supported the latter both economically and politically. She was also patron of Zangpo Pal.

Here are some of the many accomplishments of the queen: "Mongol hats didn't have a brim before. The king's eyes sparkled when he shot a bow and arrow. When he told the queen about it, the queen immediately sewed a brim for his hat. The king was very happy and immediately started to wear the hat. This sable hat is the hat depicted in the portraits of many Mongolian kings of the Yuan Dynasty.

The queen made another item of clothing. According to the Yuan shi, the invention of bijiia is attributed to Empress Chabi during the Yuan dynasty. Empress Chabi designed the bijia so that it would be a convenient form of attire while riding horses and shooting arrows. The front region of the bijia designed by Empress Chabi was made of 1-piece of fabric, and its back region was twice longer than the front region. It was collarless and sleeveless, and there were two loop straps which attached to it. It also had no lapels. The bijia was first worn by the Yuan dynasty emperor but it later became popular among commoners.

She died in 1281, probably arranging her niece Nambui to marry Kublai afterwards. She was posthumously renamed Empress Zhaorui Shunsheng (昭睿順聖皇后) by her grandson Temür Khan.

Family 
She had 4 sons and 6 daughters with Kublai khan:

Grand Princess of Zhao, Yuelie (赵国大長公主) — married to Ay Buqa, Prince of Zhao (趙王)
Grand Princess of Chan, Ulujin (吾魯真公主) — married to Buqa from Ikires clan
Princess-Aunt of the State of Chan, Chalun (昌国大长公主) – married to Teliqian from Ikires clan
 Crown Prince Zhenjin (1240–1285) — Prince of Yan (燕王)
 Manggala (c. 1242–1280) — Prince of Anxi (安西王)
 Grand Princess of Lu, Öljei (鲁国长公主) — married to Ulujin Küregen from Khongirad clan, Prince of Lu
 Nomugan (d. 1301)  — Prince of Beiping (北平王)
 Grand Princess of Lu, Nangiajin (鲁国大长公主) — married to Ulujin Küregen from Khongirad clan, Princess of Lu, then after Ulujin's death in 1278 to his brother Temür, and after Temür's death in 1290 to a third brother, Manzitai
 Kokechi (d.1271) – Prince of Liang
Princess-Aunt of the State of Je, Qutlugh Kelmysh(忽都魯 揭里迷失)(1251–1297)- married Chungnyeol of Goryeo

In popular media 
She was portrayed several times in TV series and movies:

 Marco Polo (1982) by Beulah Quo
 Eternal Happiness (2002) by Law Lan
 The Legend of Kublai Khan (2013) by Charmaine Sheh
 Marco Polo (2014) by Joan Chen
 Hojo Tokimune (2001) by Shurenhuar

Sources 
 
 Jack Weatherford (2011). The Secret History of the Mongol Queens: How the Daughters of Genghis Khan Rescued His Empire Paperback. Broadway Books. .

References 

1281 deaths
Yuan dynasty empresses
1216 births
13th-century Mongolian people
13th-century Chinese women
13th-century Chinese people
13th-century Mongolian women
13th-century Buddhists
Women of the Mongol Empire